Patryk Mucha (born 11 September 1997) is a Polish professional footballer who plays as a midfielder for Chrobry Głogów.

Career

Zagłębie Lubin
Mucha joined Zagłębie Lubin in 2013. On 2 September 2019, he was loaned out to Górnik Polkowice for the 2019-20 season.

Widzew Łódź
On 10 August 2020, he signed a two-year deal with Widzew Łódź. On 23 May 2022, it was announced his contract would not be extended.

Chrobry Głogów
On 20 June 2022, Mucha joined I liga side Chrobry Głogów on a two-year deal.

References

External links

1997 births
People from Głogów
Sportspeople from Lower Silesian Voivodeship
Living people
Polish footballers
Association football midfielders
Zagłębie Lubin players
Górnik Polkowice players
Widzew Łódź players
Chrobry Głogów players
Ekstraklasa players
I liga players
II liga players
III liga players